ISO/IEC JTC 1/SC 17/WG 1 is a working group within ISO/IEC JTC 1/SC 17 of the International Organization for Standardization (ISO) and the International Electrotechnical Commission (IEC), that facilitates standards development within the field of cards and personal identification. A national delegation of experts from various countries meet in person at WG1 to discuss and debate items detailed in a meeting agenda until a consensus is reached. These items include: draft standards, draft test methods, questions from the industry, proposals for new work items or other aspects relating to the Standards and Test Methods that WG1 bears responsibility for. WG1 meetings are usually held three times a year, typically at the beginning of March, the end of June, and at the beginning of October for a period of 2–3 days. The October meeting is typically held in the days just prior to the SC17 Plenary and at the same location.

Scope of work
Members of WG1 examine and research the physical characteristics, embossing, magnetic stripe, and test methods for conformance and card durability.

Standards and Test methods
WG1 is responsible for maintenance, including revisions, of the following standards and test methods:

Test methods

See also
The Summary of SC 17 Standards contains all current and former Sub-Committee 17 administered standards.

References

Working groups